Gergel is a surname. Notable people with the surname include:

 Max Gergel, American chemist
 Nahum Gergel (1887–1931), Ukrainian humanitarian and sociologist
 Richard Mark Gergel (born 1954), American lawyer and judge 
 Roman Gergel (born 1988), Slovak footballer midfielder